The Uruguayan Invasion was a musical phenomenon of the 1960s similar to the British Invasion, with rock bands from Uruguay gaining popularity in Argentina.

History
Inspired by British bands like The Beatles and The Rolling Stones, many young musicians in Montevideo, Uruguay began to imitate their sounds. Two bands in particular, Los Shakers and Los Mockers mirrored The Beatles and The Rolling Stones respectively. Popular bands of the Uruguayan Invasion sang mostly in English.

In the mid-1960s, as the British Invasion was at its height in the United States, Uruguayan bands began a similar rise to fame in Argentina. Record labels began rapidly signing Uruguayan rock bands to promote in Argentina. Argentine television shows like Escala Musical were also a springboard for many of the bands' popularity.

Like the British Invasion, the Uruguayan Invasion had died down by the late 1960s, as it became more popular to record harder-hitting Spanish-language music. Spurred on by the band Los Gatos's 1967 hit record "La Balsa", most bands began to record in Spanish. With the coming of the military dictatorship in 1973, the Uruguayan Invasion effectively ended.

Uruguayan Invasion bands
Los Shakers
Los Malditos
Los Mockers
Kano y Los Bulldogs

See also

 Uruguayan rock
 Argentine rock
 Korean Wave
 Taiwanese Wave
 Garage rock

References

External links
The Beat Years
The Uruguayan Invasion

Argentine music
Uruguayan music